Juan Carlos "Mandrake" Trebucq (born 6 August 1945 in Ensenada) is an Argentine former football striker.

Career
Trebucq started his career in 1965 with Gimnasia y Esgrima La Plata. In 1969, he joined Argentine club River Plate, and he helped the club reach the final of the 1969 Metropolitano championship.

After three seasons with River Plate, Trebucq moved to France where he played for Troyes and Toulouse.

References

1945 births
Living people
Sportspeople from Buenos Aires Province
Argentine footballers
Argentine expatriate footballers
Association football forwards
Club de Gimnasia y Esgrima La Plata footballers
Club Atlético River Plate footballers
ES Troyes AC players
Toulouse FC players
Expatriate footballers in France
Argentine expatriate sportspeople in France
Argentine Primera División players
Ligue 1 players
Ligue 2 players